The Angatuba Ecological Station is an ecological station in the state of São Paulo, Brazil.

Location

The Angatuba Ecological Station is in the municipality of Angatuba in the state of São Paulo.
It is within the Angatuba State Forest.

History

The ESEC was created by decree 23.790 of 13 August 1985 in state-owned land in the Angatuba municipality.
It is managed by the Instituto Florestal of São Paulo.

Environment

The station contains a significant remnant of cerrado vegetation and forest at the southern limit of this type of biome.
The cerrado is in contact with Atlantic Forest.
It has a complex ecosystem of vital importance as a refuge for animals in danger of extinction.
The vegetation consists of remnants of semideciduous forest in various stages of succession.
257 species of plant have been recorded including members of the Myrtaceae, Fabaceae, Lauraceae, Euphorbiaceae, Rutaceae, Rubiaceae, Mimosoideae and Caesalpinioideae plant families. 
Animals include the giant anteater (Myrmecophaga tridactyla), southern tamandua (Tamandua tetradactyla) and maned wolf (Chrysocyon brachyurus).

Notes

Sources

Ecological stations of Brazil
Protected areas of São Paulo (state)
Protected areas established in 1985
1985 establishments in Brazil